The Escape Artist is a 1982 film starring Griffin O'Neal and Raúl Juliá. It was based on a book by David Wagoner, and was the directorial debut of Caleb Deschanel. It was the final film of Joan Hackett, Desi Arnaz, and Gabriel Dell, and the film debut of Harry Anderson.  It was also the final film performance of Jackie Coogan, though one film he had shot earlier (The Prey, which was shot in 1979) was not released until 1983.

Plot
Young and self-confident Danny Masters is the teen-aged son of the late Harry Masters, the "greatest escape artist except for Houdini". Danny himself is an accomplished magician and escape artist. He leaves home to join Uncle Burke and Aunt Sibyl in their magic/mentalist act; Sibyl welcomes him, but Burke is unenthusiastic.

Danny soon finds himself embroiled with Stu Quiñones, corrupt son of Mayor Leon Quiñones. The quest for a missing wallet (pick-pocketed by Danny) leads to the comeuppance of the crooked mayor, and separately of his vindictive and out-of-control son. Along the way, Danny comes to terms with the death of his father, the circumstances of which he did not previously know.

Cast
 Raúl Juliá as Stu Quiñones
 Griffin O'Neal as Danny Masters
 Desi Arnaz as Mayor Leon Quiñones
 Teri Garr as Arlene
 Joan Hackett as Aunt Sibyl
 Gabriel Dell as Uncle Burke
 John P. Ryan as Vernon
 Elizabeth Daily as Sandra
 M. Emmet Walsh as Fritz
 Jackie Coogan as Magic Shop Owner
 Hal Williams as Cop At Mayor's Office
 Helen Page Camp as Neighbor
 David Clennon as Newspaper Editor
 Huntz Hall as Turnkey
 Harry Anderson as Harry Masters
 Carlin Glynn as Treasurer's Secretary
 Margaret Ladd as Reporter
 Garry Marshall as Drummer
 Doug McGrath as The Photographer
 Richard Bradford as Sam City Treasurer (uncredited)

Production notes
This film was shot in 1980, but remained unreleased for two years as it underwent extensive re-editing.  The cast includes two members of the 1930s troupe the Dead End Kids: Gabriel Dell and Huntz Hall.

Reception
The film received mixed to poor reviews, with critics generally praising the performances, but finding the script elements unfocused.  Vincent Canby of the New York Times noted that the finished film "represents a lot more talent than is ever demonstrated on the screen."

References

External links
 
 
 

1982 films
1982 drama films
American independent films
Films based on American novels
Films shot in Cleveland
American Zoetrope films
Orion Pictures films
Warner Bros. films
Films about magic and magicians
Films directed by Caleb Deschanel
American drama films
Films with screenplays by Melissa Mathison
Films scored by Georges Delerue
1982 directorial debut films
1982 independent films
1980s English-language films
1980s American films